Nicolo (Nick) Ferrari (born 31st January 1959) is a Conservative British radio host, television presenter and broadcast journalist. He is best known as the host of the weekday breakfast show on the London-based radio station LBC. He also has a regular column in the Sunday Express and was previously a regular guest on The Alan Titchmarsh Show. He regularly appears on ITV's programme This Morning and has presented the Sky News debate show The Pledge since 2016.

Early life 
His father, Lino "Dan" Ferrari, ran a news agency, Ferrari Press Agency, and Nick was keen to work in the media himself. He was educated at Eltham College, a private school for boys in Mottingham in southeast London.

Career

Journalism

Ferrari became a news reporter on the Sunday Mirror
in 1981 and subsequently a show business reporter at The Sun and editor of the paper's "Bizarre" gossip page. During this period, he interviewed Roger Moore on the set of the James Bond film Octopussy (1983) for The Sun and appeared as an extra in the movie. Subsequently he became features editor of the News of the Worlds Sunday magazine and assistant editor of the Daily Mirror.
A friend of former The Sun editor Kelvin MacKenzie, Ferrari joined him at L!VE TV
where he devised such programmes as Topless Darts, the News Bunny mascot and the weather forecast presented by a dwarf on a trampoline.

Radio
Ferrari joined Talk Radio in 1999 as co-presenter of the Big Boys' Breakfast show with David Banks, shortly after the station was purchased by former colleague Kelvin MacKenzie in 1998. The show was scheduled between 6am and 9am and focused on entertainment rather than news content. 

In late 1999, it was announced that the show would be cancelled as part of the relaunch of Talk Radio as Talk Sport to focus entirely on sports content.

In 2001, Ferrari presented his first breakfast programme on LBC, taking on the role officially in 2004. The programme runs from 7am to 10am and takes the format of a news and political debate and discussion show with the presenter introducing topics and then discussing them with both members of the public and experts, through text messaging, email and phone, with the last of the three being the main mode of contact. The programme mixes both light entertainment stories and more serious topics in the news. Ferrari frequently asks first-time callers which station they previously listened to, rejoicing when they have deserted BBC Radio 4 or BBC London 94.9. Ferrari is also known for deliberately not mentioning the phone number to call the programme while presenting as he believes it is an unnatural way to speak to listeners.

In the run-up to the 2017 General Election an interview with Diane Abbott on Ferrari's show made national headlines after she struggled to provide figures for police policy. 

When questioned on the policy, Abbott stated 10,000 police officers would cost £300,000, before correcting herself to £80 million. Ferrari questioned further on this figure and pointed out that it would only allow for paying each police officer £8,000. In a subsequent article Ferrari stated that he had banned Abbott from his show due to her failing to appear for previous scheduled interviews and had only allowed her to feature to aid the balance of subjects interviewed on the programme. Later the same day the BBC's The Daily Politics replayed the interview to Abbott where she defended her performance, saying: "I did seven interviews this morning. In that seventh interview I misspoke". Ferrari was awarded the 2018 IRN Best Interview award for his role in interviewing Diane Abbott where judges praised him for "[representing] the role of listeners and voters brilliantly".

The show received the Sony Breakfast Show of the Year award in 2006 as well as the Arqiva Breakfast Show of the year in 2010. Ferrari was also awarded the Sony Speech Broadcaster of the year in 2009. and the Arqiva Gold Award in 2010 for "outstanding contribution to the industry over the last twelve months".

Television
Ferrari presented the discussion programme Forum on Press TV, an Iranian news channel. He quit his show on the station on 30 June 2009 in protest at the reporting of the Iranian presidential election on 12 June 2009.

In 2006, Ferrari also made an appearance on the BBC/HBO comedy show Extras.

Politics
It was suggested in June 2006 by Conservative leader David Cameron that, if he joined the Conservative Party and put himself forward, Ferrari could win the ballot to be the party's candidate for Mayor of London. Ferrari indicated, however, that he would not stand, as he "did not want to leave the listeners". This role was eventually taken by Boris Johnson.

Ferrari does not recycle because the number of recycle bins mean "you've lost your front garden", he said on BBC's The Daily Politics.

Ferrari voted to Leave in the 2016 EU membership referendum, but did not agree with the government's settled status fee (which was later scrapped).

In September 2019, Ferrari said, after a visit to Israel, "I'd been given an insight into a country that I've always admired and I now revered".

Controversy

In 2003, the Broadcasting Standards Commission upheld a complaint against Ferrari, finding that his programme's "active reinforcement of prejudiced views about asylum seekers had exceeded acceptable boundaries for transmission". 

Following this, and at a time of frosty relations between Ferrari and the former Mayor of London, Ken Livingstone, the Mayor wrote to the Managing Director of LBC 97.3 asking what measures had been implemented to ensure the situation would not arise again. Following this, Livingstone appeared regularly on Ferrari's programme to answer questions from listeners.

In 2015, Ferrari was investigated by Ofcom after he said on his radio programme that the November 2015 Paris attacks were "a Muslim problem" and told a Muslim caller to "go some place else" if the caller didn't agree with UK foreign policy. Ofcom found Ferrari not in breach of any broadcasting rules, saying "We found the caller was given an opportunity to rebuke Mr Ferrari's offensive comments, while two other callers also challenged Ferrari in strong terms. In addition, the presenter made clear that he was not characterising all Muslims as extremists or criminals".

On a May 2018 Sky News panel, Ferrari reacted to Afua Hirsch's questioning of statues of Horatio Nelson, Cecil Rhodes and Winston Churchill by saying: "Why do you stay in this country, if you take such offence when you see Nelson's column, if you take such offence when you hear Winston Churchill's name? … If it offends you so much, how do you manage to stay here?" Hirsch, who argued that it was because she loved her country that she questioned it, was born in Norway, to a British father and Ghanaian mother, but raised in Wimbledon. A controversy erupted on social media when Afua Hirsch tweeted an excerpt of the exchange in June 2020. Critics questioned whether Ferrari would have equally suggested that a white British person might wish to leave the UK.

On 10 May 2022, during a phone interview with academic scholar Michael Bankole from King's College London, Ferrari tried to repeatedly convince that he himself is a person of colour, despite being a white man; he said that 'white is a colour'.

Personal life
Ferrari is a supporter of Leicester City.

References

External links
 Nick Ferrari on LBC
 Arqiva Commercial Radio Awards
 Sony Radio Academy Awards 2006
 Sony Radio Academy Awards 2009

1959 births
Living people
English people of Swiss descent
English people of Italian descent
LBC radio presenters
People educated at Eltham College
People from Sidcup
Press TV people
Radio presenters from London
Shock jocks
20th-century British journalists